Eyo (2009) is an eponymous novel written by Abidemi Sanusi. It was published by WordAlive Publishers. In this novel, the author discusses issues of child trafficking and sex slavery through the experiences of children that are trafficked to Europe each year. It was shortlisted for the Commonwealth Writers' Prize in 2010.

Synopsis

Eyo, an illiterate 10-year-old girl is trafficked to the UK with promises of a better life. The novel follows her five-year journey as a domestic servant and eventual sex slave in the UK, her attempts to escape and her journey around the UK as she's passed from one human trafficker to another. Eventually, she is rescued only to realise that even in freedom, society demands an exacting price from those it should protect.

The novel starts with Eyo's life in one of Nigeria’s most notorious slums and follows her journey from Lagos, Nigeria, to the UK. She is put to work immediately by her abductors who beat and threaten her daily to keep her pliable. She is an illiterate, illegal immigrant with no family, friends nor means of escape. How does she escape? Who can she turn to for help and how does she endure?

Plot summary

In the story an illiterate ten-year-old girl, Eyo, is trafficked to the United Kingdom by her father with promises of work, an education and a fortune. And thus begins her five-year ordeal, first as a domestic servant and then as a child sex slave. Eventually, she is rescued from slavery by a Catholic priest and nun and sent back home to Nigeria with a view to rebuilding her life. However, she finds out that even in freedom, society demands an exacting price from those it should protect.

In the first of the four parts of the book, entitled "African Flower", the story opens with Eyo and her young brother, Lanre, eking out a living by selling iced water in Ajegunle, a sprawling slum in Lagos, Nigeria. Christened Jungle City by its residents, life is harsh and brutal, both day and night. One must have nerves of steel to survive. Eyo finds herself warding off petty thieves and molesters in the streets, and an amorous landlord at home. But it is her father, Wale, who sexually harasses her with the full knowledge of her mother. She's willing to play her father's sex toy as long as he does not touch her five-year-old sister Sade.

Plagued by financial problems, Wale approaches his old friend, Femi, to take Eyo away from Jungle City. Uncle Femi, a human trafficker and once a resident of Jungle City, has grown wealthy from illicit trade. He agrees to take Eyo to London where she would get an education and thereafter a good job and with it a fortune. She would be sending money and other things home to help her siblings. Perhaps when she's settled she'd send for her siblings and they too would get an education and a job.

Upon arrival in London, she's taken to a couple who have "bought" her to take care of their children. She's "imprisoned" in the house where she is forced to do household work from early in the morning till late in the night. She not only works forcefully, but she is also assaulted physically at the slightest provocation. Soon, Sam, the man of the house, starts to sexually assault her and, having discovered her skills, which were learned from her experiences with Wale her father, begins to play pimp. It is only when she miscarries that the couple gets rid of her by "selling" her to another pimp, Big Mama.

At Big Mama's, Eyo performs well, thanks to her experience at Jungle City. She becomes Big Mama's favourite sex provider and income earner. In this second part of the book, entitled “African Lolita”, Eyo comes face to face with the harsh reality of commercial sex and worst of all sex slavery. Despite the earnings she brings to Big Mama through clients’ fees and other compliments, she does not get anything better than rationed food. She has to satisfy clients whatever and whenever Big Mama desires.

Fearing that Eyo might gain her freedom through her clients, Big Madam passes on the "sex slave" to another pimp named Johnny. Johnny is both crude and violent constantly unleashing terror on Eyo whenever she fails to comply with his orders. He also makes pornography using her. Now having given up on the earlier promises, she sinks into helplessness and is no longer sure that she's human anymore. She refuses to be called Eyo again and adopts the name "Jungle Girl", the title of the third part of the book.

While with Johnny, who also doubles up as her boyfriend, Eyo encounters the tireless Father Stephen and Sister Mary who have devoted their lives to rescuing girls like Eyo from the streets. After numerous attempts by the duo to get to Eyo, they only managed when Eyo sought asylum at the Sanctuary. It is here that Eyo rediscovers herself and, with the help of Nike, a human rights lawyer, starts the road to recovery. Nike is also determined to bring the perpetrators of this inhuman practice to book. But to her surprise, the underground network that runs the trade is so deep-rooted that it is difficult to uproot.

Bibliography

References

 Commonwealth Foundation News & Events
 Book review from Kenya
 Eyo on Abidemi Sanusi website
Eyo on WordAlive Publishers website
 Eyo Update
 Kenyanbooks Blog review

External links
 Abidemi Sanusi website
 WordAlive Publishers website

Eyo

Novels about slavery
2009 Nigerian novels
Novels set in Nigeria
Novels set in Lagos